Symphony No. 7 (also known as A Toltec Symphony) is a 2005 symphony by Philip Glass.  The National Symphony Orchestra commissioned Glass to write it to commemorate the 60th birthday of conductor Leonard Slatkin.  Slatkin conducted the debut concert on January 20, 2005 at the Kennedy Center, which Glass attended.

Composition
The symphony is scored for piccolo, 2 flutes, 2 oboes, English horn, 2 B clarinets, E clarinet, 2 bassoons, 4 horns 3 trumpets, 3 trombones, tuba, timpani, rattle, tom-tom, wood block, glockenspiel, piano, celesta, harp, violins, violas, cellos, basses, organ, and chorus.

At 30 minutes long, it has three movements:

Inspiration
Glass said that he wrote the symphony about Mesoamerica and the life of Native Americans centuries before the arrival of European explorers.  The first movement, "The Corn," focuses on the interplay between Mother Nature and those she provides for.  "The Hikuri (the Sacred Root)" is not a root (it is a cactus) that grows in the northern and central Mexican deserts and is thought to be a gateway to the spiritual world, hikuri.  Finally, the last movement is about "the holder of the Book of Knowledge," whom every truth-seeking person must face.

Glass has integrated three transcendental concepts of ancestral culture (Huichol) : The first is the " corn " which means, desire to return to the innocence before adulthood (the connection with Mother Earth); the second, the hikuri is the sacred vision of corn and Blue Deer, and this represents the third symbolism, from this world to the hereafter can do it, because when get the blue deer, stop being ordinary, and the man will be transformed.

External links
Kennedy Center description of debut concert
Kennedy Center program notes including notes by Philip Glass

 07
2005 compositions
Philip Glass albums
Glass 07
Music for orchestra and organ
Glass 07
Music commissioned by the National Symphony Orchestra